A by-election was held for the Australian House of Representatives seat of Corangamite on 18 February 1984. This was triggered by the resignation of Liberal Party MP Tony Street. The by-election was held to coincide with the Hughes and Richmond by-elections.

The election was comfortably won by Liberal candidate Stewart McArthur.

Candidates

Democratic Labor Party – Joseph Lam.
Liberal Party of Australia – Stewart McArthur, a local farmer and company director.
Australian Labor Party – Gavan O'Connor, a local farmer and teacher. O'Connor was later elected to federal Parliament as the member for Corio in 1993.
National Party of Australia – David Seymour.

Results

See also
 List of Australian federal by-elections

References

1984 elections in Australia
Victorian federal by-elections
1980s in Victoria (Australia)
February 1984 events in Australia